This is a list of the longest-running television presenters in the United Kingdom, on their respective programmes. List excludes newsreaders and voice work.

References

British television-related lists
United Kingdom-related lists of superlatives